Magarasi is a 2019 Indian-Tamil language television soap opera premiered on 21 October 2019 on Sun TV and it is available for worldwide streaming on Sun NXT. The show is produced by Citram Studios. It stars Srithika Saneesh and SSR Aaryann in lead roles.

Plot
Tamizh, a rich Chidambaram based IT employee leaves Haridwar with his child by train. When the train departs from Haridwar, Bharathi gets the train with the help of Tamizh. They both introduced themselves and Tamizh narrated his tragic love marriage life to Bharathi. Tamizh initially had left his joint family and refused to marry both of his cousins to marry Ragini, his colleague. This made his mother fall into a coma. But Ragini wanted to lead a luxurious life and spent all his money in vain. This leads to a big misunderstanding between them and they got separated. Bharathi introduced herself to Tamizh that she is from Haridwar, and will tell the rest on one fine day. She insists to travel with him until Chidambaram. There, by seeing Tamizh with the child and girl, his family thinks that Bharathi would be his wife. Everyone shows affection towards her. She too tries to get Tamizh's mother up from the coma. And she succeeds in that too. This reduces the gap between Tamizh and his father.  One day Tamizh gets to know that Bharathi is already married.

Everyone starts to live like a single family. Though Bharathi mingled in the family, she is not happy and always feels that her position, affection, love from the family belong to another girl, Ragini. She attempts a couple of times to leave the home but does not succeed.

One day, Tamizh's friend shows a trending video of Bharathi,  who was chased by some henchmen of her uncle Pandian. So Tamizh insists Bharathi reveal the truth. Bharathi who was too rich lived with her husband Puvi. They both believed that helping the needy is the best way to reach God. But Pandian and his nephew Mithun showed her wrong accounts and manipulated her property. Puvi suspected them and informed Bharathi. But Bharathi blindly believed her uncle. When Bharathi identified their originality, they wanted to kill Bharathi and Puvi. In the event, Bharathi escaped and got a train to Chennai.

Now at the present Tamizh and Bharathi become good friends and Tamizh helps Bharathi to save her property and Puvi.

One day, Tamizh's parents arranged a marriage for Tamizh and Bharathi unknown relationship. Ragini came to the scene and Bharati falls unconscious, made the marriage stop there. Tamizh's mother went to ask why her son's life with Bharathi is not that good at a priest and he revealed the truth that Bharathi is her first daughter in law that means Puvi is Tamizh's biological elder brother

In Divya's last episode, Bharathi met with an accident.It makes her face damaged.She had a face transplant and get a new face (Srithika Saneesh). In the accident,she also lost her memory.Now,the story continued with Bharathi's new face and her name also changed as "Shakthi".

Cast

Main
 Divya Sridhar / Srithika Saneesh as Bharathi Puviarasan  
 SSR Aaryann as Puviarasan (Puvi) Chidambaram (Shenbagam and Chidambaram elder son)

Recurring
 Vijay as Tamilarasan (Tamil) Chidhambaram (Shenbagam and Chidambaram younger son)
 Mounika Devi as Malliga Tamilarasan 
 Praveena / Sriranjini as Shenbagam Chidhambaram (Chidambaram 's Wife) 
 Deepan Chakravarthy replacement Poovilangu Mohan as Chidhambaram (Shenbagam 's husband) 
 Ashwini replacement Raghavi Sasikumar as Gomathi Gopalan (Gopalan 's Wife Chidambaram youngest daughter)
 Senthilnathan as Pechiappan
 Nethra Shri as Sengamalam 
 Ravishankar as Kathiravan 
 Satvik as Rahul Tamilarasan 
 Keerthana as Durga Bhai
 Ramji as Sivamani 
 Vandhana Michael as Chandrika Senthoora Pandiyan (Main Antagonist)
 Riyaz Khan as Senthoora Pandiyan 
 Gayathri Priya as Doctor Sujatha
 Mahalakshmi as Anbarasi Chidhambaram Manohar (Shenbagam and Chidambaram eldest daughter)
 Vijay Anand as "Gethu" Manohar
 Gracy Thangavel as Aburva
 Sivaji Manohar as Gopalan
 Mithun Raj as Mugilan
 Madhumita Illayaraja replacement Shamina Shetty as Illavarasi Chidhambaram  (Shenbagam and Chidambaram Youngest daughter)
 Harish G as Velan Gopalan 
 Anju Prabhakar as Chamundeshwari
 Sneha Nambiar replacement Swetha as Banumathy Kathiravan 
 Vaishali Thaniga as Gayathri Gopalan 
 Vinitha Jaganathan replacement Swetha Senthilkumar as Vanmathi Kathiravan 
 Feroz Khan as Nandhan Pechiappan 
 Gayathri Yuvaraj / Divya Ganesh / Vanitha Hariharan / Ashrita Sreedas as Ragini Tamilarasan

Guest Appearance
 Raghuvaran (Photo Appearance) / Sathish as Puniyamoorthy
 Ammu Ramachandran as Sandhya
 Vaiyapuri as Rajendran
 Srithika Saneesh as herself 
 Papri Ghosh as Kayal Kuttisundaram 
 Aarthi Subash as Malliga Anbusundaram
 Vasu Vikram as Vishwanathan
 Priya as Meenakshi Vishwanathan

Development

Casting 
Keladi Kanmani's fame Divya Sridhar was selected to portray the lead female role Bharathi. But unfortunately due to her personal commitments she was replaced by Srithika Saneesh (Nadhaswaram fame) from June 2021. SSR Aaryann was cast in the male lead role as Puviarasan. Vijay was cast in the second male lead role as Tamilarasan. The series marks the television debut for SSR Aaryann and Vijay. Praveena was cast in the main lead role as Shenbagam. In 2020, lead Praveena quit the series. Praveena was replaced by Sriranjini. Besides Riyaz Khan, Deepan Chakravarthy, Ramji, Anju, Mounika Devi and Ashwini were cast then.

Post COVID-19 break when the production resumed in July 2020 after three months, Deepan Chakravarthy was replaced by Poovilangu Mohan, Ashwini was replaced by Raghavi Sasikumar, Madhumita Ilaiyaraja was replaced by Shamina Shetty.

Dubbed version

References

External links 

Sun TV original programming
2019 Tamil-language television series debuts
Television shows set in Tamil Nadu
Tamil-language television soap operas
Tamil-language television shows
Tamil-language melodrama television series